Mike Terpstra (born 1963), is an American basketball coach. He has previously served various positions with junior college, high school, and NBA Development League. He is the CEO of University Recruiting Group, an organization that assistants athletes and coaches through the recruiting process. He helped the Colorado 14ers win the Western Division championship before losing to the Dakota Wizards in the championship round.

Ripon Christian High School
Terpstra helped lead the high school to three state championships (1992 and 1994 as head coach and 1988 as assistant coach).

Northwest Nazarane University
During his tenure with Northwest Nazarane, he compiled a 17–10 record. That record was the best record the school has had as a Division II school.

Oklahoma City Thunder
Terpstra began his tenure with the Thunder in the 2013–14 NBA season.
The Thunder accumulated the best NBA record before the 2014 NBA All-Star Game so the 2013–14 Oklahoma City Thunder coaches coached the Western Conference All-Stars.

Personal life
Terpstra attended the University of the Pacific and earned a Master's Degree in sports Science there.

References

Living people
American expatriate basketball people in Australia
American expatriate basketball people in Turkey
American expatriate basketball people in the United Kingdom
American men's basketball coaches
College men's basketball players in the United States
Colorado 14ers coaches
Fenerbahçe men's basketball players
High school basketball coaches in the United States
Idaho Stampede (CBA) coaches
Junior college men's basketball coaches in the United States
Northwest Nazarene University alumni
Oklahoma City Thunder assistant coaches
Stanislaus State Warriors men's basketball coaches
University of the Pacific (United States) alumni
Washington Wizards assistant coaches
American men's basketball players
1963 births